The Municipality of Luanda is one of the nine municipalities that make up the province of Luanda, Angola. It covers roughly 116 km2 (second smallest in the province) and includes Ilha de Luanda. The population was 2,194,747 at the 2014 census and is projected to be 2,571,861 in 2019 per Instituto Nacional de Estatística, República de Angola.

Administrative divisions
The municipality of Luanda is made up of six urban districts:
 Ingombota
 Rangel
 Maianga
 Angola Quiluanje
 Samba
 Sambizanga

References

Municipalities in Luanda
Populated places in Luanda Province